Gachsaran Airport  is an airport serving Dogonbadan (Gachsaran), Iran.

Airlines and destinations

References

Airports in Iran
Buildings and structures in Khuzestan Province
Transportation in Khuzestan Province